Kumbakonam Brahma Temple is a Hindu temple located in Kumbakonam, Thanjavur district, Tamil Nadu, India. This temple is dedicated mainly to Vishnu, as the moolavar presiding deity, and He is known as Vedanarayanaperumal over here. His consort, Lakshmi, is known as Vedavalli.

Significance 
At the right side of the sanctum sanctorum Brahma is found in a separate shrine. He is flanked by Saraswati and Gayatri. At the left, Yoganarasimha is found with Sridevi and Bhoodevi.

Also, it is not the only temple dedicated to Brahma in the world, the other temple being the Brahma Temple, Pushkar, in Pushkar, in the Indian state of Rajasthan.

In addition, there is a temple dedicated to Brahma (with four faces) at Bengaluru, Karnataka.

Speciality 
Though the presiding deity is called as Vedanarayanaperumal, this temple is generally known as Brahma Temple.

References

External links 
 
 
 

Hindu temples in Kumbakonam
Vishnu temples